Mount View is a historic house located at 610 S. Jefferson St. in Sheridan, Wyoming. The Prairie School home was built from 1911 to 1912 and designed by Glenn Charles McAllister. The house features a hipped roof, overhanging eaves with  paneled soffits and box cornices, bracketed corners, four brick chimneys, and a porch on each side. Lyman Brooks, a Sheridan businessman and politician who served in the Wyoming House of Representatives, was the house's first owner, and his family owned the home until the 1980s. The house was added to the National Register of Historic Places on December 8, 1997.

References

Houses on the National Register of Historic Places in Wyoming
Prairie School architecture in Wyoming
Houses completed in 1911
Houses in Sheridan County, Wyoming
National Register of Historic Places in Sheridan County, Wyoming
Sheridan, Wyoming